Josh Simpson (born 9 February 1994) is an Australian rules footballer who played for the Fremantle Football Club in the Australian Football League (AFL).

Football career 
Originally from the small town of Yalgoo in the Murchison region of Western Australia, he represented West Australia at the 2012 AFL Under 18 Championships.

After spending the most of the 2013 season playing for East Fremantle in the West Australian Football League (WAFL), Simpson was one of ten players brought into the Fremantle side in the final round of the 2013 AFL season against St Kilda at Etihad Stadium, when many senior players were rested ahead of the finals matches.

Simpson was delisted at the conclusion of the 2014 AFL season after only playing one AFL game for the year. He was twice fined by the club during the season and sent to complete a personal development program after failed to board a flight to Sydney with the team in April.

References

External links

WAFL Statistics

1994 births
Living people
Fremantle Football Club players
East Fremantle Football Club players
Peel Thunder Football Club players
Australian rules footballers from Western Australia
Indigenous Australian players of Australian rules football
Swan Districts Football Club players